The Quilombos de Barra do Turvo Sustainable Development Reserve is a sustainable development reserve in the state of São Paulo and the Atlantic Forest ecoregion, in southeastern Brazil.

Location

The Quilombos de Barra do Turvo Sustainable Development Reserve is in the municipality of Barra do Turvo, São Paulo.
It is formed by remnant Communities of Quilombos of Ribeirão Grande, Terra Seca, Cedro and Pedra Preta, distributed along BR-116 and SP-552.

History

The Quilombos de Barra do Turvo Sustainable Development Reserve  was created by state law 12.810 of 21 February 2008.
This law broke up the old Jacupiranga State Park and created the Jacupiranga Mosaic with 14 conservation units.
The reserve is administered by the state forest foundation (Fundação para Conservação e a Produção Florestal do Estado de São Paulo).

Notes

Sources

Sustainable development reserves of Brazil
Protected areas of São Paulo (state)
Protected areas of the Atlantic Forest
Protected areas established in 2008
2008 establishments in Brazil